The Bronze Cross of the Kingdom of the Netherlands (Dutch: "Het Bronzen Kruis") was instituted on 11 June 1940 by Queen Wilhelmina of the Netherlands while she was residing in London during the German occupation of the Netherlands. The Bronze Cross has precedence after the Resistance Star East Asia, but is the third highest military decoration still being awarded for bravery.

Several British, American, Canadian and Polish soldiers are among the 3,501 recipients of the Bronze Cross that is awarded by Royal Decree.

External links
 Bronze Cross - Official site of the Chancellery of the Netherlands Orders (English)
 Vereniging DMD  - Website of the organization of veterans with the Bronze Cross (Dutch)

Awards established in 1940
 
Military awards and decorations of the Netherlands